No. 114 Squadron was a squadron of the British Royal Air Force. It was first formed in India during the First World War, serving as a light bomber squadron during the Second World War and as a transport squadron post-war. It was last disbanded in 1971.

History

Formation and World War I
No. 114 Squadron Royal Flying Corps was formed at Lahore, India in September 1917, by splitting off part of No. 31 Squadron, becoming part of the Royal Air Force on 1 April 1918. Equipped with the B.E.2, the squadron carried out patrol operations over the North-West Frontier, flying from Quetta, with a detachment at RAF Khormaksar, Aden. The squadron partly re-equipped with Bristol Fighters in October 1919, but was disbanded on 1 April 1920, by renumbering the squadron to No. 28 Squadron.

Reformation and World War II

The squadron reformed on 1 December 1936 at RAF Wyton, initially equipped with Hawker Hind single-engined biplane light bombers.  It joined No. 2 Group of RAF Bomber Command on 1 March 1937, receiving more modern Bristol Blenheim I twin-engined monoplanes later that month, being the first RAF squadron to operate the Blenheim, while briefly operated a few Hawker Audaxes as trainers while converting to the Blenheim. The squadron received improved Blenheim IVs from April 1939, carrying out long-range navigation flights over France in July and participating in the annual home defence exercise in August 1939.

The squadron flew its first operations of the Second World War on 13 October 1939, when two aircraft, operating as a detachment from France, carried out reconnaissance flights over the Ruhr, one of the two Blenheims not returning. The squadron was allocated to join the Advanced Air Striking Force (AASF), moving to France in December 1939. On 10 May 1940, Germany invaded Belgium and the Netherlands, and on the next day, a German air attack against 114 Squadron's airfield at Vraux destroyed six of the squadron's Blenheims, with the rest of aircraft being damaged.  Although the squadron did fly a few bombing missions against the German advance, its losses meant it was soon evacuated back to the UK, with its remaining Blenheims (along with those of 139 Squadron) being used to reinforce the British Expeditionary Force Air Component's reconnaissance squadrons.

The squadron rejoined 2 Group on 10 June 1940, attacking concentrations of barges in the German-held channel ports and Luftwaffe airfields by night. In March 1941, the squadron was loaned to RAF Coastal Command for convoy escort duties and patrols over the North Sea from RAF Thornaby in Yorkshire and RAF Leuchars in Fife, Scotland, returning to Bomber Command control at RAF West Raynham in July 1941. On 12 August 1941, the squadron took part in a large-scale low-level attack by 2 Group Blenheims against two power stations at Knapsack and Quadrath near Cologne. 114 Squadron contributed 12 Blenheims against the Knapsack power station, losing one aircraft to anti-aircraft fire; 12 Blenheims were lost of the 54 sent on the raid. As well as daylight  operations, the squadron also took part in night intruder and bombing operations. On 11 February 1942, the German battleships ,  and the heavy cruiser  broke out from Brest, France, heading up the English Channel to return to Germany. The German force was only spotted by the British when it was near Dover, prompting attempts by British sea and air forces to sink the German ships. Nine of 114 Squadron's Blenheims formed part of the 242 aircraft of Bomber Command launched against the German force. While three of the squadron's aircraft sighted the German battleships and attacked, like the rest of the bombs and torpedoes expended against the German ships, missed, although both battleships were damaged by previously-laid mines. The squadron continued on night attacks through March and April 1942, and on the night of 30/31 May, flew attacks against German night-fighter bases in support of Operation Millenium, the RAF's "1000 bomber" raid against Cologne. In August 1942, the squadron withdrew from its night intruder duties to convert to the newer Blenheim Mark V bomber (also known as the Bisley) in preparation for deployment in support of Operation Torch, the Anglo-American invasion of French North Africa.

The squadron, part of 326 Wing,  moved to Blida in Algeria in November 1942, with the role of supporting the British First Army. The Bisley, however, had poor performance and was vulnerable to fighter attack, and the squadron was therefore largely confined to night bombing. Bisley losses continued to be high, and in January 1943 the squadron relinquished its Bisleys to 614 Squadron, and waited for new aircraft, receiving more Bisleys in February and returning to operations. In March the squadron finally received more modern equipment, replacing its Bisleys with Douglas Boston light bombers, returning to operation with its new aircraft on 21 April. 

The squadron then operated from Sicily and Italy, having been re-equipped with Douglas Boston aircraft, which it retained until the end of the war when they were replaced with the De Havilland Mosquito.

Post War 

The squadron reformed in Egypt in 1947, and was located at RAF Kabrit. It was equipped with Dakota transport aircraft.  It then operated Vickers Valettas and De Havilland Chipmunks. The squadron's final equipment was the Armstrong Whitworth AW.660 Argosy tactical transport aircraft, which was flown from their RAF Benson base from 1962 until 1971, when the squadron was finally disbanded.

Aircraft operated

References

Bibliography

 
 
 
 .
 
 
 .

External links

 History of No.'s 111–115 Squadrons at RAF Web
 Bomber Command No.114 Squadron

114
114
Military units and formations established in 1917
1917 establishments in the United Kingdom
Military units and formations in Aden in World War II
Military units and formations disestablished in 1920
Military units and formations established in 1936
Military units and formations disestablished in 1946
Military units and formations established in 1947
Military units and formations disestablished in 1957
Military units and formations established in 1959
Military units and formations disestablished in 1961
Military units and formations established in 1961
Military units and formations disestablished in 1971